Warner Bros. Discovery EMEA is a subsidiary of Warner Bros. Discovery. The subsidiary is responsible for managing the collection of their cable and satellite networks around the Europe, Middle East and Africa regions.

History

WarnerMedia EMEA 
As Turner Broadcasting System EMEA

In 1985, Ted Turner launched a European division in London, England, which would reach across the Middle East and African regional feed.

Rebranding as WarnerMedia

In 2019, Turner EMEA would be moving to its new headquarters in Old Street, Shoreditch, London. The new headquarters would have more office space, allowing room for the company's European operations to expand, and a brand new custom-built CNN newsroom. The remaining division was later rebranded as WarnerMedia EMEA by 2020.

Discovery Networks EMEA 
It started out with the launch of the Discovery Channel in Europe in 1989. In mid-2007, Discovery Networks Europe was split into two separate branches, Discovery Networks UK and Discovery Networks EMEA, with the following: localised branches Discovery Networks Deutschland, Discovery Networks Benelux, Discovery Networks Nordic, Discovery Networks Italia and Discovery Networks EMEA (which served all other territories). Again in 2011, Discovery Networks Europe was split into two key branches Discovery Networks Western Europe (DNWE) and Discovery Networks CEEMEA (Central & Eastern Europe, Middle East and Africa). DNWE was located in London and the operations in the United Kingdom, Republic of Ireland, Netherlands, Sweden, Denmark, Norway, Finland, France and Flanders. All other operations in Europe are operated by Discovery Networks CEEMEA in Warsaw.

In November 2014, Discovery Networks Western Europe was split into Discovery Networks Northern Europe and Discovery Networks Southern Europe. Its previous Discovery Networks Western Europe served 30 countries including the United Kingdom, Ireland, Iceland, Denmark, Sweden, Norway, France, the Netherlands and other territories, comprising 18 brands.

Between 2014 and 2016 Discovery Networks EMEA consisted of the following branches: Northern Europe, CEEMEA, Southern Europe.

From late 2016 all localised operations fall under the umbrella of Discovery EMEA with headquarters in Amsterdam and London, and local offices in among other Milan and Warsaw.

Discovery halted all broadcasts of its 15 linear channels to Russia through the Media Alliance partnership on 9 March 2022 in response to the Russian invasion of Ukraine.

Merger as Warner Bros. Discovery EMEA 
Discovery EMEA were merged into WarnerMedia, forming Warner Bros. Discovery EMEA in 2022.

Pan-European 
 Animal Planet
 Denmark
Netherlands & Flanders
Poland
Russia
Scandinavia
 Boing
 Africa
 France
 Italy (49%)
 Spain
 Boomerang
 Middle East, Africa, Greece and Cyprus
 France
 Italy
 Pan-Nordic
 Portugal, Angola and Mozambique
 Turkey
 Cartoon Network
 Arabic
 Middle East, Africa and Cyprus
 Central and Eastern Europe
 Russia
 France, Wallonia and Switzerland
 Germany, Austria, Switzerland and Liechtenstein
 Italy
 Netherlands and Flanders
 Pan-Nordic
 Poland
 Portugal
 Turkey
 Cartoonito
 UK and Ireland
 Italy
 France 
 Benelux, Germany, Central & Eastern Europe
 Portugal 
 Africa 
 MENA 
CNN
 Czech Republic
 Portugal
 Romania
 Turkey
 Discovery Channel
 Flanders
 France
 Hungary
 Italy
 MENA
 Netherlands
Poland
Portugal
Spain
Turkey
UK and Ireland
 Discovery Science
Denmark
France
Netherlands and Flanders
Poland
Turkey
 DMAX
 Germany, Austria, Switzerland and Liechtenstein
 Italy
 UK
 Spain
 Turkey
 DTX
 Eurosport (UK joint venture with BT Group)
 Eurosport 1
 Eurosport 2
Food Network
Italy
Poland
Portugal
Turkey
 GB News (minority stake)
HGTV 
Italy
Germany
Poland
Romania
 Investigation Discovery
Denmark
France
Netherlands
Norway
Poland
Portugal
Russia
Sweden
Turkey
 Kanal 5
 Denmark
 Sweden
Motor Trend
Italy
 Turner Classic Movies
 MENA
 France
 Spain
 TLC
 Denmark
Netherlands
Norway
Poland
 Portugal
Romania
Sweden
Turkey
 TNT
 Africa
 Spain
 Toonami
 France
 Africa
 Spain 
 Travel Channel
Poland
Sweden
Turkey
Spain
 Warner TV
 France, Wallonia and Switzerland
 Germany, Austria, Switzerland
 Comedy
 Film
 Serie
 Italy
 Poland
 Romania

United Kingdom 

Discovery Networks UK was a branch of Discovery Networks responsible for overseeing Discovery Networks Europe's channels in the United Kingdom and in the Republic of Ireland. As of autumn 2011, Discovery Networks UK is now operated by Discovery Networks Western Europe.

Discovery Networks UK started out with the launch of the Discovery Channel in Europe in 1989 and was for a long time a part of Discovery Networks Europe (DNE). In early 2007, DNE was split into two separate branches, Discovery Networks UK and Discovery Network EMEA, both headquartered in London. As of 2011 Discovery Networks Europe has merged its operations in the UK, Nordic region and other parts of Western Europe to form Discovery Networks Western Europe.

In the UK the Discovery Channel has been the number one factual channel throughout its 20-year history. It has a 47 percent share of the PAYTV factual market (Source BARB/TechEdge).

Current operations 
In 2007, Discovery Networks Europe decided to localize its networks across Europe. This resulted in the establishment of Discovery Discovery Networks Deutschland, Discovery Networks Benelux, Discovery Networks Nordic, Discovery Networks UK and Discovery Networks Italia and Discovery Networks EMEA (which served all other territories). As of 2011, operations in the United Kingdom, Germany, Italy, Sweden, Denmark, Norway, Finland, France and Flanders are operated by Discovery Networks Western Europe. All other operations in Europe are operated by Discovery Networks CEEMEA in Warsaw.

Television channels 
 Animal Planet
 Boomerang
 Cartoon Network
 Cartoonito
 CNN International
 Discovery Channel
 Discovery History
 Discovery Science
 Discovery Turbo
 DMAX
 Food Network
 HGTV
 Investigation Discovery
 Quest
 Quest Red
 Really
 TLC
 TCM

Nordic 
Discovery Communications Nordic (formerly Discovery Networks Nordic and SBS Discovery Media) was a branch of Discovery Networks Northern Europe, a part of Warner Bros. Discovery EMEA. Headquartered in Copenhagen, Denmark, the company represents Warner Bros. Discovery operations in Denmark, Finland, Norway and Sweden.

History 
SBS Broadcasting Group's operations in the Nordics

Discovery Networks Nordic

Discovery Networks Nordic previously held responsibility for overseeing Discovery Networks brands in Denmark, Sweden, Norway and Finland with headquarters in Copenhagen. Discovery Networks Nordic's key operations are the localization of Discovery Channel and the pan-Nordic Animal Planet. Discovery Networks Nordic also promotes other brands operated by Discovery Networks Europe.

Discovery acquires SBS in Nordics

On 9 April 2013 Discovery's acquisition of SBS Nordic from German media group ProSiebenSat.1 was finalised. At the time of the merger, SBS had been a major commercial broadcaster in Scandinavia for two decades. The combined viewing shares made it the second largest commercial television group in Norway and the third largest in Denmark.

After acquisition

SBS Discovery's radio stations were later sold to Bauer Media Group.

Television channels 

 Animal Planet Nordic
 Discovery Channel Sweden
 Discovery Channel Norway
 Discovery Channel Denmark
 Discovery Channel Finland
 TLC Sweden
 TLC Norway
 TLC Finland
 6'eren
 Frii
 Eurosport Norge
 Canal 9
 FEM
 Kanal 4
 Kanal 5 (Denmark)
 Kanal 5 (Sweden)
 Kanal 9
 Kanal 11
 Kutonen
 MAX
 TV5
 TVNorge
 VOX

Benelux 
Discovery Benelux was a branch of Discovery Inc. that was responsible for channels in the Netherlands and Belgium. Founded on 17 September 1997, in Amsterdam, Netherlands Discovery Benelux operated Discovery Netherlands, Discovery Flanders, Animal Planet, TLC, Eurosport 1, Eurosport 2 and Investigation Discovery in the region with local advertising, sponsorship, programming and the use of the local language either dubbed or subtitled. Discovery Benelux also use existing services from Discovery International: Discovery Science.

History 
In 2007, Discovery Networks Europe decided to localize its networks across Europe. This resulted in the establishment of Discovery Networks Deutschland, Discovery Networks Benelux, Discovery Networks Nordic, Discovery Networks UK & Ireland, Discovery Networks Italia and Discovery Networks EMEA (which served all other territories). As of 2011, localized operations in the United Kingdom & Republic of Ireland, Germany, Italy, Nordic countries (Sweden, Denmark, Norway & Finland), France and Benelux (Netherlands & Flanders) fall under Discovery Networks Western Europe. All other operations in Europe are operated by Discovery Networks CEEMEA in Warsaw.

In November 2014, Discovery Networks Western Europe was split into Discovery Networks Northern Europe and Discovery Networks Southern Europe.

Travel Channel, Fine Living and Food Network closed in the Netherlands and Flanders on 31 January 2019. Content from these former Scripps television channels has been integrated into the programming of Discovery, TLC and Investigation Discovery in the Benelux.

In 2019 Discovery Benelux launched Dplay, a video on demand streaming service with content of Discovery, TLC and Investigation Discovery. On 5 January 2021, Discovery+ replaced Dplay.

Television channels 

 Animal Planet
 Boomerang
 Cartoon Network
 CNN International (through parent company CNN Global)
 Discovery Channel Netherlands
 Discovery Channel Flanders
 Discovery Science
 Eurosport 1
 Eurosport 2
 Investigation Discovery
 TLC

Germany 
WarnerMedia System Deutschland, GmbH, (translated as Warner Bros. Discovery Germany, LLC; formerly Turner Broadcasting System Deutschland, GmbH) was one of WarnerMedia EMEA's divisions in Europe. It was headquartered in Munich. Hannes Heyelmann was the general manager and vice president of the company.

Channels 

 Boomerang
 Cartoon Network Germany, Austria & Switzerland
 Cartoon Network Central & Eastern Europe
 Cartoon Network Poland
 Cartoon Network Russia & Southeastern Europe
 CNN International (through parent company CNN Global)
 Discovery Channel Germany, Austria, Switzerland and Liechtenstein
 Tele 5 (replaced musicbox)
 TLC Germany
 WarnerTV Comedy (previously Glitz*, TNT Glitz and TNT Comedy)
 WarnerTV Film (previously TCM and TNT Film)
 WarnerTV Serie (previously TNT Serie)

Staff 
 Hannes Heyelmann
 Hagen Biewer
 Silke Gelhaus
 Anke Greifeneder
 Matthias Heinze
 Petra Malenicka

Regional 
 6'eren (Denmark)
 Canal 9 (Denmark)
 Discovery History (UK and Ireland)
 Discovery Showcase (Turkey)
 Discovery Turbo (UK & Ireland)
 Eurosport 2 Xtra (Germany)
 Eurosport Norge (Norway)
 Fatafeat (MENA)
 FEM (Norway)
 Frii (Finland)
 Frisbee (Italy)
 Giallo (Italy)
 K2 (Italy)
 Kanal 4 (Denmark)
 Kanal 9 (Sweden)
 Kanal 11 (Sweden)
 Kutonen (Finland)
 MAX (Norway)
 Nove (Italy)
 Quest (UK & Ireland)
 Quest Red (UK & Ireland)
 Real Time (Italy)
 Really (UK & Ireland)
 Tele 5 (Germany)
 TV5 (Finland)
 TVNorge (Norway)
 VOX (Norway)

Defunct channels 
 CNX - replaced by Toonami UK & Ireland
 Toonami (UK & Ireland) - replaced by Cartoonito
 Cartoon Network +1 (2002–06) - replaced by Cartoon Network Too and TCM 2
 Cartoon Network (Spain)
 Boomerang (Spain) - replaced by Cartoonito
 Boomerang Germany, Austria & Switzerland - replaced by Boomerang CCE
 Cartoon Network Too - replaced by Cartoon Network +1
 Cartoon Network Arabic +2
 Cartoonito (Spain)
 Discovery Family (France)
 TNT Classic Movies - replaced by Turner Classic Movies
 Discovery Shed
 Discovery Home & Health (UK & Ireland)
 DKids (MENA)
 Eurosport DK - replaced by Eurosport 2
 Nuts TV
 Nuts TV +1
 TCM (North European)
 TCM 2 - replaced by Turner Classic Movies +1
 Turner Classic Movies CEE - replaced by TNT Romania and Poland
 TruTV (UK and Ireland) - acquired by Sony Pictures Television on 16 February 2017
 Discovery Travel & Living
 Discovery World
 Fine Living

See also 
 Discovery Networks Northern Europe
Discovery Networks CEEMEA 
Discovery Networks Deutschland

References

External links 
 Corporate site
 Europe, Middle East and Africa from Discovery Communications
 
 Turner Media Innovations (the advertisement sales team)
  for Discovery Networks Danmark 
  for Discovery Networks Finland 
  for Discovery Networks Norway 
  for Discovery Networks Sweden 
  for Discovery Benelux 
  Discovery Networks UK

 
1985 establishments in England
Mass media companies established in 1985
Warner Bros. Discovery subsidiaries
Television channels and stations established in 1985
Television channels and stations established in 1989
Companies based in Amsterdam
Mass media companies based in London
Europe, the Middle East and Africa